"The Sun Goes Down" was a single released by Irish hard rock band Thin Lizzy, the last single to be released before they split in 1983. It is featured on the group's album from that year, Thunder and Lightning.

Television performances
On 26 January 1983, the song was performed live for the first time during a concert in Hitchin, which was broadcast simultaneously on television and radio for the BBC's "Sight and Sound in Concert". This show also marked the debut of guitarist John Sykes. Two days later, the band performed the song on the British TV music show The Tube, along with "Cold Sweat" and "The Boys Are Back in Town".

Single
The song was written by Phil Lynott and Darren Wharton, and Lynott said at the time, "I think that one is a nice note to go out on. I can see it being played on the radio and fully believe it has great chart potential." The single entered the UK charts on 6 August 1983, reaching No. 52.

There was no official promotional video with the single as the record company had decided it was too expensive. The band began work on editing video clips of live performances to accompany the song but this was abandoned when it was clear that the single's chart performance did not merit the effort.

Cover versions
German heavy metal band Sinner covered "The Sun Goes Down" on their 1998 album The Nature of Evil. They later covered the b-side to the single as well, "Baby Please Don't Go", on their Mask of Sanity album in 2007.

The song was also covered in 2009 by Jørn Lande (as Jorn) on his album Spirit Black and by Night Demon in 2022.

Personnel
Phil Lynott – bass guitar, lead vocals
Scott Gorham – lead guitar
John Sykes – lead guitar
Brian Downey – drums
Darren Wharton – keyboards

References

Thin Lizzy songs
1983 singles
Songs written by Phil Lynott
Vertigo Records singles
1983 songs